The Slieve Aughty are a mountain range in the western part of Ireland spread over both County Galway and County Clare. The highest peak in the Slieve Aughty Mountains is Maghera in Clare which rises to 400 m (1,314 ft). The mountain range consists of two ridges divided by the Owendallaigh river which flows west into Lough Cutra.

The Cenél Áeda na hEchtge partly derived their name from them.

References 
The Historical Geography of the Slieve Aughty 

Mountains and hills of County Clare
Mountains and hills of County Galway